Strážnice is a town in Hodonín District in the South Moravian Region of the Czech Republic. It has about 5,400 inhabitants. The historic town centre is well preserved and is protected by law as an urban monument zone.

Etymology
The name is derived from stráž (i.e. "guard") and refers to the original function of the castle which was built here in the 13th century.

Geography
It lies in the Lower Morava Valley. The river Morava flows along the northwestern border of the municipal territory. The river Velička flows into the Morava through the northern part of Strážnice. The town is located on the Baťa Canal.

The southern part of Strážnice lies in the Bílé Karpaty Protected Landscape Area, even though it is not part of the eponymous mountain range. The municipal territory briefly borders Slovakia in the south.

History

The area has been inhabited since time immemorial. Items from the Neolithic Linear Pottery culture have been found here.

The first written mention of Strážnice is from 1302. A water castle guarding the Hungarian border was built here after 1260. In the 13th century, Strážnice was acquired by the lords of Kravaře. Petr Strážnický of Kravaře contributed to the prosperity of the town and expanded the Strážnice manor  After the town was severely damaged in the Hussite Wars, it recovered and expanded during the rule of Jiří of Kravaře.

In the early 16th century, the Strážnice manor was bought by the Zierotin family. During their rule, Strážnice achieved its greatest prosperity. The town was fortified and the old castle was rebuilt to a Renaissance residence. At the beginning of the 17th century, it was one of the most populated and most important Moravian towns.

In 1605, Strážnice was burned down by Stephen Bocskai and his army and many people were killed. During the Thirty Years' War, the town further suffered and was repeatedly ravaged. In 1628, Strážnice was bought by František Magnis and the catholicization of the town began. A large fire in 1652, plague epidemics in 1680, and another Hungarian raid in 1683 caused the decline of the manor and the town lost its former significance.

Demographics

Sights

The Strážnice Castle was rebuilt to its current Neorenaissance form with Neoclassical elements in the mid-19th century. Today the castle houses the National Institute of Folk Culture. There is a permanent exposition of "Folk instruments of the Czech Republic" and a historical library with more than 13,000 books. The castle is surrounded by a large English park with the longest plane alley in Central Europe founded in the first half of the 19th century. Amphitheatres, a summer cinema, lakes, a dendrology path with educational boards are located in the park.

The Jewish cemetery was founded in the mid-17th century. The neighbouring synagogue was built in 1804, after the old synagogue of unknown age was destroyed by a fire. In 1870, the synagogue was reconstructed. After it was severely damaged in 1941 and then used as a warehouse, it was returned to the Brno Jewish Community in 1991 and renovated. Today it is a part of Strážnice Museum and contains various Jewish-related expositions.

The roads leading to neighbouring towns of Veselí nad Moravou and Skalica are flanked by massive century bastions from the late 16th century. They are the remains of gates built as part of fortifications of the town from the threat of Turkish invasions.

Strážnice is known for the ethnographic open-air museum called Strážnice Museum of the Villages of South-east Moravia. It was opened in 1981. It presents traditional village buildings in subregions of the cultural region of the Moravian Slovakia.

Notable people
John Amos Comenius (1592–1670), philosopher and pedagogue; lived and studied here in 1604–1605
Jan Evangelista Purkyně (1787–1869), anatomist and physiologist; worked here as a pedagogue
Tomáš Garrigue Masaryk (1850–1937), politician and the first president of Czechoslovakia; studied here
Joseph Tomanek (1889–1974), Czech-American artist

Twin towns – sister cities

Strážnice is twinned with:
 Skalica, Slovakia

Gallery

References

External links

The open-air Strážnice Museum of the Villages of South-east Moravia

Cities and towns in the Czech Republic
Populated places in Hodonín District
Moravian Slovakia